Carol McElwee is an American politician and teacher from Maine. A Republican, Mcelwee has served in the Maine House of Representatives since 2012. She is a teacher of English at the Adult Education Center in Caribou, Maine.

References

Year of birth missing (living people)
Living people
People from Fort Fairfield, Maine
Republican Party members of the Maine House of Representatives
Women state legislators in Maine
21st-century American politicians
21st-century American women politicians